There were several special elections to the United States House of Representatives in 1883 during the 47th and 48th Congresses.

47th Congress 

|-
| 
| William M. Lowe
|  | Greenback
| 18781880 1882 
|  | Incumbent died October 12, 1882.New member elected January 3, 1883.Democratic gain.Successor seated January 15, 1883.Successor had not been elected to the next term on November 7, 1882, which had already been won by fellow Democrat Luke Pryor.
| nowrap | 

|-
| 
| Jonathan T. Updegraff
|  | Republican
| 1878
| nowrap | 

|-
| 
| Godlove S. Orth
|  | Republican
| 18621870 18721874 1878
|  | Incumbent died December 16, 1882.New member elected January 9, 1883.Republican hold.Successor seated January 17, 1883.Successor had not been a candidate to the next term, see below.
| nowrap | 

|}

48th Congress 

|-
| 
| Jonathan T. Updegraff
|  | Republican
| 1878
| nowrap | 

|-
| 
| John E. Kenna
|  | Democratic
| 1876
|  | Incumbent resigned March 4, 1883, when elected U.S. Senator.New member elected May 15, 1883.Democratic hold.Successor seated December 3, 1883.
| nowrap | 

|-
| 
| Thomas H. Herndon
|  | Democratic
| 1878
|  | Incumbent died March 28, 1883.New member elected July 3, 1883.Democratic hold.Successor seated December 3, 1883.
| nowrap | 

|-
| 
| Marsena E. Cutts
|  | Republican
| 18801883 1882
|  | Incumbent died September 1, 1883.New member elected October 9, 1883.Democratic gain.Successor seated December 3, 1883.John C. Cook had successfully contested Cutts's 1880 election.  Cook had beaten Cutts in the 1882 election, but Cutts, meanwhile, had already won election to the next term.  So Cook only served one day: March 3, 1883, before the new term began.  Cutts, however, never served in the new term, as he died of tuberculosis before being seated.
| nowrap | 

|-
| 
| Dudley C. Haskell
|  | Republican
| 1876
|  | Incumbent died December 16, 1883.New member elected October 9, 1883.Republican hold.Successor seated March 21, 1884.
| nowrap | 

|-
| 
| Walter F. Pool
|  | Republican
| 1882
|  | Incumbent died August 25, 1883.New member elected November 20, 1883.Democratic gain.Successor seated December 3, 1883.
| nowrap | 

|}

References 

 
1883